Ippolita Trivulzio (1600 – 20 June 1638) was the Princess of Monaco by marriage to Honoré II of Monaco, and was the first Monegasque consort to bear the title of Princess.

Biography 
Ippolita was the only daughter of Carlo Emanuele Teodoro Trivulzio, Count of Melzo and Caterina of Gonzaga-Castelgoffredo. Her family originated from Milan.  Her older brother was Gian Giacomo Teodoro Trivulzio.

Ippolita was brought up in a convent.  Her brother married Giovanna Maria Grimaldi, the sister of Honoré II.  In 1615, Honoré II returned to Monaco from Milan, where he had spent his childhood with his Spanish maternal uncle, to resume government after having reached his age of majority. Marriage to provide an heir was one of the first political issues to be solved, and Ippolita, being the sister-in-law of his sister Jeanne, was successfully introduced to him as a simple and suitable solution.

She married Honoré II, Prince of Monaco on 13 February 1616. The couple had one son. Ippolita was described as "demure, slim, dark-haired, a potential beauty and raised by nuns." Her spouse was pious, domestic and homely and the marriage was described as a happy one. As Honoré II redecorated the Princely residence from a medieval fortress to a princely palace and introduced several courtly customs and official religious stately ceremonies to create a sense of national and monarchial feelings between the dynasty and the Monegasque population, Ippolita was given a bigger role in public representation than her predecessors." During the years 1624–30, they also hosted the state visits of Archduke Charles of Austria, Maria Anna of Austria and the future Emperor Ferdinand III.

Princess Ippolita died in her thirty-eighth year.

Originally buried in the crypt of the Cathedral of Our Lady Immaculate, she was moved on 4 November 1966 by decision of Prince Rainier III.

Issue

Ercole Grimaldi, Marquis of Baux (16 December 1623 – 2 August 1651) married Maria Aurelia Spinola (d. 1670) and had issue.

Ancestors

References

1600 births
1638 deaths
House of Grimaldi
Princesses of Monaco
Burials at the Cathedral of Our Lady Immaculate
Ippolita
Nobility from Milan
House of Gonzaga
17th-century Italian women